The 2004 China Open was a tennis tournament played on outdoor hard courts. It is the 6th edition of the China Open, and is part of the International Series of the 2004 ATP Tour, and of the Tier II of the 2004 WTA Tour. Both the men's and the women's events are held at the Beijing Tennis Center in Beijing, People's Republic of China. The men's event took place from 13 to 19 September 2004, while the women's took place the following week from 20 to 26 September 2004.

Additionally, a mixed doubles tournament was held from 22 to 25 September 2004, although it counted only as an exhibition tournament and, therefore, no points were given for the ATP and WTA rankings.

Finals

Men's singles

 Marat Safin defeated  Mikhail Youzhny, 7–6(7–4), 7–5

Women's singles

 Serena Williams defeated  Svetlana Kuznetsova, 4–6, 7–5, 6–4

Men's doubles

 Justin Gimelstob /  Graydon Oliver defeated  Alex Bogomolov Jr. /  Taylor Dent, 4–6, 6–4, 7–6(8–6)

Women's doubles

 Emmanuelle Gagliardi /  Dinara Safina defeated  Gisela Dulko /  María Vento-Kabchi, 6–4, 6–4

Mixed doubles

 Tripp Phillips /  Emmanuelle Gagliardi  defeated  Justin Gimelstob /  Jill Craybas, 6–1, 6–2

References

External links
China Open on the official Association of Tennis Professionals website
China Open on the official Women's Tennis Association website

China Open
China Open
2004
2004 in Chinese tennis
2004 China Open (tennis)